Gatwick Airport, also known as London Gatwick , is a major international airport near Crawley, West Sussex, England,  south of Central London. In 2022, Gatwick was the second-busiest airport by total passenger traffic in the UK, after Heathrow Airport, and was the 8th-busiest in Europe by total passenger traffic.

Gatwick opened as an aerodrome in the late 1920s; it has been in use for commercial flights since 1933. A secondary runway is available but, due to its proximity to the main runway, can only be used if the main runway is not in use. In 2018, 46.1 million passengers passed through the airport, a 1.1% increase compared with 2017.

History

The land on which Gatwick Airport stands was first developed as an aerodrome in the late 1920s. The Air Ministry approved commercial flights from the site in 1933, and the first terminal, "The Beehive", was built in 1935. Scheduled air services from the new terminal began the following year. During the Second World War, the airport was taken over by the military and was known as RAF Gatwick. After the war, the airport returned to its civilian capacity. Major development work at the airport took place during the 1950s. The airport buildings were designed by Yorke Rosenberg Mardall between 1955 and 1988.

In the 1960s, British United Airways (BUA) and Dan-Air were two of the largest British independent airlines at Gatwick, with the former establishing itself as the dominant scheduled operator at the airport as well as providing a significant number of the airport's non-scheduled services and the latter becoming its leading provider of inclusive tour charter services. Further rapid growth of charter flights at Gatwick was encouraged by the Ministry of Aviation, which instructed airlines to move regular charter flights from Heathrow. Following the takeover of BUA by Caledonian Airways at the beginning of the following decade, the resulting airline, British Caledonian (BCal), became Gatwick's dominant scheduled airline during the 1970s. While continuing to dominate scheduled operations at Gatwick for most of the 1980s, BCal was also one of the airport's major charter airlines until the end of the 1970s (together with Dan-Air, Laker Airways and British Airtours). As a result of conditions imposed by Britain's Monopolies and Mergers Commission on the takeover of BCal by the then newly privatised British Airways (BA) at the end of the 1980s, Dan-Air and Air Europe assumed BCal's former role as Gatwick's dominant scheduled short-haul operator while BA continued in BCal's erstwhile role as the airport's most important scheduled long-haul operator. Following the demise of Air Europe and Dan-Air (both of which had continued to provide a significant number of charter flights in addition to a growing number of scheduled short-haul flights at Gatwick) in the early 1990s, BA began building up Gatwick into a secondary hub (complementing its main hub at Heathrow). These moves resulted in BA becoming Gatwick's dominant airline by the turn of the millennium. BA's subsequent decision to de-hub Gatwick provided the space for EasyJet to establish its biggest base at the airport and to become its dominant airline.

BAA Limited (now Heathrow Airport Holdings Limited) and its predecessors, BAA plc and the British Airports Authority, owned and operated Gatwick from 1 April 1966 to 2 December 2009.

From 1978 to 2008, many flights to and from the United States used Gatwick because of restrictions on the use of Heathrow implemented in the Bermuda II agreement between the UK and the US. The US-based carriers that flew to Gatwick were American (from Dallas/Fort Worth, Nashville, New York–JFK, Raleigh/Durham and St. Louis), Braniff (from Dallas/Fort Worth), Continental (from Cleveland, Houston–Intercontinental and Newark), Delta (from Atlanta, Cincinnati and New York–JFK), Eastern (from Miami), Northwest (from Detroit and Minneapolis/St. Paul), PeoplExpress (from Newark), Piedmont (from Charlotte), TWA (from New York–JFK and St. Louis), and US Airways (from Charlotte, Philadelphia and Pittsburgh). US Airways, Gatwick's last remaining US carrier, ended its service between Gatwick and Charlotte on 30 March 2013. This left Gatwick without a scheduled US airline for the first time in 35 years. Prior to the COVID-19 pandemic, Delta Air Lines announced its intent to launch service between Gatwick and Boston in summer 2020, which would have made it the first US airline to service Gatwick since the withdrawal of the US Airways service in 2013, but the massive global travel downturn placed these plans on indefinite hold. In 2021 JetBlue became the first US airline to serve Gatwick since 2013, with services to New York–JFK and Boston.

On 17 September 2008, BAA announced it would sell Gatwick after the Competition Commission published a report about BAA's market dominance in London and the South East. On 21 October 2009, it was announced that an agreement had been reached to sell Gatwick to a consortium led by Global Infrastructure Partners (GIP), who also have a controlling interest in Edinburgh airport, for £1.51 billion. The sale was completed on 3 December. In February 2010, GIP sold minority stakes in the airport of 12% and 15% to the South Korean National Pension Service and the Abu Dhabi Investment Authority (ADIA) for £100 million and £125 million, respectively. The sales were part of GIP's strategy to syndicate the equity portion of the original acquisition by issuing bonds to refinance bank debt. Although this entails bringing additional investors into the airport, GIP aims to retain management control. The Californian state pension fund CalPERS acquired a 12.7% stake in Gatwick Airport for about $155 million (£104.8 million) in June 2010. On 21 December 2010, the A$69 billion (£44 billion) Future Fund, a sovereign wealth fund established by the Australian government in 2006, agreed to purchase a 17.2% stake in Gatwick Airport from GIP for £145 million. This transaction completed GIP's syndication process for the airport, reducing its stake to 42% (although the firm's extra voting rights meant it still controlled the airport's board).

In August 2020, the airport announced that has plans to cut over a quarter of its employees as a result of a planned company restructuring caused by the effects of the COVID-19 pandemic. The planned cuts will bring the total workforce of the airport to 1,900; before the start of the pandemic it was 3,300, however, an additional 785 jobs were cut earlier in 2020.

Ownership
The airport is owned and operated by Gatwick Airport Limited, a wholly owned subsidiary of Ivy Holdco Limited, owned by Global Infrastructure Partners (GIP), among others. In December 2018, Vinci announced that it would acquire 50.01% majority stake for £2.9bn, with a GIP-managed consortium of investors (Abu Dhabi Investment Authority, Australia's sovereign wealth fund and two public pension funds in California and South Korea) owning the remaining 49.9%. The sale was completed by the middle of 2019.

In August 2021, it was reported that Gatwick's operators were in talks with lenders following posting first-half year net losses of £245m.

Operations

Facilities
On 31 May 2008, Virgin Holidays opened the V Room, Gatwick's first lounge dedicated to their long-haul leisure travellers. On 25 January 2017, the lounge moved to the North Terminal together with the Virgin Atlantic Clubhouse as part of the airline moves that saw British Airways and Virgin Atlantic exchange their previous terminal locations and EasyJet consolidated in the North Terminal. On 9 April 2009, an independent pay-for-access lounge opened in the South Terminal. Gatwick also has a conference and business centre, and several on- and off-site hotels ranging in class from executive to economy.

The airport has Anglican, Catholic and Free Church chaplains, and there are multi-faith prayer and counselling rooms in each terminal. A daily service is led by one of the chaplains.

The Civil Aviation Authority Safety Regulation Group is in Aviation House. WesternGeco, a geophysical services company, has its head office and Europe–Africa–Russia offices in Schlumberger House, a  building on the airport grounds near the South Terminal. The company had a 15-year lease on the building, scheduled to expire in June 2008. In 2007, WesternGeco reached an agreement with its landlord, BAA Lynton, extending its lease to 2016 at an initial rent of £2.1 million. Fastjet has its registered and head offices at Suite 2C in First Point at the airport.

Before the sale, BAA planned an £874 million investment at Gatwick over five years, including increased capacity for both terminals, improvements to transport interchange and a new baggage system for the South Terminal. Passengers passing through the airport are informed about the redevelopment programme with large mobile barcodes on top of construction hoardings. Scanning these transfers information on the construction to the user's smartphone.

In summer 2013, Gatwick introduced Gatwick Connect, a free flight connection service to assist passengers changing flights at Gatwick whose airlines do not provide a full flight connection service. On 15 September 2015, the service was rebranded as "GatwickConnects". It is available to passengers connecting on several major airlines.

Flight movements

Gatwick operates as a single-runway airport although it has two runways; the northern runway (08L/26R) can only be used when the main runway (08R/26L) is out of use for any reason. The UK Integrated Aeronautical Information Package gives the Takeoff Run Available (TORA) of its main runway (08R/26L) as 3,255 m when aircraft take off in a westerly direction (26) and 3,159 m when takeoffs occur in an easterly direction (08). The documentation lists the respective TORA for the northern runway (08L/26R) as 2,565 m in both directions. Nearly three-quarters of takeoffs are towards the west (74% over a 12-month period). During normal operations the northern runway is used as a taxiway, consistent with its original construction (although it was gradually widened).

In October 2018, the airport announced that it was "exploring how to make best use of its existing runways, including the possibility of bringing its existing standby runway into routine use". One scenario would see 08L/26R used for departing narrow-body aircraft only, while the longer 08R/26L would be used for wide-body take-offs and all landings; widening 08L/26R would also increase the centreline separation slightly. New technology could also be used to increase capacity on the main runway, and in the longer term the airport remains interested in constructing a new runway to the south.

The main runway uses a Category III Instrument Landing System (ILS). The northern runway does not have an ILS; when it is in use, arriving aircraft are radar vectored to intercept a RNAV (GNSS) approach, providing the aircraft is equipped and the operator has approval. This approach is satellite based and is also available for the main runway. When an RNAV approach is not possible, assistance from the approach controller using surveillance radar, a 'SRA approach' is available. This involves heading instructions and altitude callouts supplied by the Air Traffic Controller. On both runways, a continuous descent approach is used to minimise the environmental effects of incoming aircraft, particularly at night.

Night flights are subject to restrictions; between 11 pm and 7 am, noisier aircraft (rated QC/8 and QC/16) may not operate. From 11.30 pm to 6 am (the night quota period) there are three limits: Number of flights, a Quota Count system, limiting total noise permitted and no night QC/4 flights.

Security
The airport is policed by the Gatwick District of Sussex Police. The district is responsible for the entire airport (including aircraft) and, in certain circumstances, aircraft in flight. The 150 officers attached to this district include armed and unarmed officers, and community support officers for minor offences. The airport district counters man-portable surface-to-air missiles (MANPADS) by patrolling in and around the airport and a separate sub-unit has vehicle checks around the airport.

Access to airside portions of the airport is controlled and maintained by the airport's team of security officers, regulated by the Department for Transport. Brook House, an immigration-removal centre of Immigration Enforcement, was opened near the airport on 18 March 2009 by the then Home Secretary Jacqui Smith.

Major airlines
The airport is a base for scheduled airlines British Airways (BA), EasyJet, Wizz Air, and charter operators such as TUI Airways. Gatwick is unique amongst London's airports in its representation of the three main airline business models: full service, low-cost and charter. As of October 2016, these respectively accounted for 26.6%, 61.3% and 13.1% of Gatwick's seat capacity.

By late 2015, EasyJet flew over 100 routes from Gatwick with a fleet of more than 60 aircraft. The airport is the carrier's largest base, and its 16 million passengers per year accounted for 45% of Gatwick's 2013 total (ahead of Gatwick's second-largest passenger airline: BA, whose 4.5 million passengers comprised 14% of total passenger traffic in 2011–12).

EasyJet, BA and Norwegian were Gatwick's three biggest resident airlines, although in late 2020 Norwegian announced the closure of its base at Gatwick. According to data from Airport Coordination Limited, these three airlines respectively accounted for 43.3%, 19% and 10.5% of airport slots in April 2018. According to this data, by April 2018 Norwegian had overtaken Virgin Atlantic as Gatwick's number one transatlantic airline by seat capacity, and BA's competitive response to Norwegian's growing commercial threat to its transatlantic business would result in Virgin's relegation to third position among the airport's transatlantic airlines during the 2018 summer timetable period. EasyJet, BA and Norwegian collectively accounted for 65.43% of Gatwick's total passengers in 2016 (EasyJet: 40.37% / 17.4 million; BA: 14.39% / 6.2 million; Norwegian: 10.67% / 4.6 million). As per Official Airline Guide (OAG) data for the week of 29 May 2017, their respective international departure seat capacity shares at the airport for summer 2017 are: 42.1%, 15.4% and 9.4%.

In terms of passengers carried, EasyJet and BA were also among the five largest airlines operating at Gatwick in 2010 (which also included TUI Airways and Thomas Cook Airlines at the time) and the top 10 in 2015. In terms of total scheduled airline seats at Gatwick in 2014, EasyJet accounted for 18.36 million, more than two-and-a-half times as many as second-placed BA (seven million) and nearly five times the number offered by third-placed Norwegian Air Shuttle (3.74 million). Using data sourced from the OAG Schedules Analyser, the following changes in the respective departure seat capacity shares of Gatwick's three biggest airlines occurred from 2010 to 2015: EasyJet's share increased from 26.1% in 2010 to 42.1% in 2015; BA's share dropped from 18.3% in 2010 to 15% in 2015; Norwegian's share rose almost three-fold from less than 3% in 2010 to 8.3% in 2015. EasyJet, BA, Norwegian, TUI Airways, Ryanair, Thomas Cook Airlines, Monarch Airlines, Virgin Atlantic, Vueling and Emirates were Gatwick's top 10 airlines by share of passengers in 2017.

EasyJet's acquisition of BA franchise carrier GB Airways in March 2008 increased its share of airport slots to 24% (from 17% in late 2007); the airline became the largest short-haul operator at the airport, accounting for 29% of short-haul passengers. By 2009, BA's share of Gatwick slots had fallen to 20% from its peak of 40% in 2001. By 2010, this had declined to 16%. By mid-2012, EasyJet had 45% of Gatwick's early-morning peak time slots (6 am to 8:55 am).

By 2008, Flybe was Gatwick's third-largest airline (accounting for 9% of its slots) and its fastest-growing airline. It became the airport's largest domestic operator, carrying 1.2 million passengers in its 2011–12 financial year on eight routes to destinations in the UK, the Channel Islands and the Isle of Man. In March 2013, the airline announced that it would end operations at Gatwick, citing unsustainably high airport charges and increases in UK Air Passenger Duty. Flybe sold its 25 pairs of daily slots at the airport to EasyJet for £20 million. The latter's share of Gatwick slots increased to 44% in summer 2014; second-placed BA has held about 16% of the airport's slots since 2010. Following the sale of its Gatwick slots to EasyJet, Flybe continued to provide the scheduled service between Gatwick and Newquay, as a result of being awarded the contract to fly this route under a four-year Public Service Obligation (PSO), until the flight was subsequently moved from Gatwick to Heathrow Airport in April 2019.

The EU–US Open Skies Agreement, which became effective on 30 March 2008, led a number of airlines to downsize their transatlantic operations at Gatwick in favour of Heathrow. Continental Airlines was the second transatlantic carrier (after American Airlines) to leave Gatwick after its decision to transfer the seasonal Cleveland service to Heathrow on 3 May 2009.

Slots left by the US carriers (and the collapse of Zoom Airlines, Oasis Hong Kong Airlines, XL Airways UK, Sterling Airlines, Monarch Airlines, Thomas Cook Airlines, and Adria Airways) were taken by EasyJet, Flybe, Norwegian Air Shuttle and Ryanair. A number of full-service airlines have established or resumed operations at the airport, including Turkish Airlines, Air China, Cathay Pacific, WestJet, Qatar Airways, China Eastern Airlines, JetBlue, and Delta Air Lines.  This is part of the airport's strategy to attract higher-spending business travellers (countering its dependence on European low-cost and charter markets), increasing year-round capacity utilisation by smoothing peaks and troughs in traffic. Gatwick's success in persuading these airlines to launch (or re-launch) routes to overseas destinations important for business and leisure travel was aided by a lack of comparable slots at Heathrow.

On 5 May 2020, Virgin Atlantic announced it would cease operations at Gatwick due to the COVID-19 pandemic. On 18 August 2020, Wizz Air announced a new hub at Gatwick Airport. Initially basing their A321 aircraft there along with additional commercial routes to Greece, Italy, Spain, and Malta operating from 22 October 2020, onwards.

In September 2021, the International Airlines Group announced that British Airways will terminate its short- and medium-haul base operations at Gatwick with immediate effect resulting in the cancellation of more than 30 routes. This came after labour negotiations regarding the handover of these operations, most of which were still suspended due to the COVID-19 pandemic, to a newly formed budget subsidiary failed. British Airways continues to serve two domestic destinations, Glasgow and Manchester alongside their long-haul network from Gatwick.

British Airways has now resumed short haul flights from Gatwick, as a new subsidiary which will be initially operated by British Airways, but will soon be managed under the trading name 'EuroFlyer' The company expects this to happen by Autumn 2022.

City Place Gatwick

Gatwick's original terminal, the Beehive, is included within the City Place Gatwick office complex together with 1, 2 and 3 City Place. The complex was developed by BAA Lynton. A number of airlines have had offices at the Beehive, including BEA/British Airways Helicopters, Jersey Airlines, Caledonian Airways, Virgin Atlantic and GB Airways.
Other airlines which had headquarters on airport property (including office buildings on the site of, or adjacent to, the original 1930s airport) include British Caledonian, British United Airways, CityFlyer Express, Fastjet, Laker Airways and Tradewinds Airways.

Gatwick Aviation Museum

Situated to the north-west of the airfield near the village of Charlwood, there is a museum including original items and photographs from Gatwick's history, as well as a variety of military aircraft.  It is open Friday, Saturday and Sunday all year round.

Terminals

The airport has two terminals with 65 total gates, South and North. Both have shops and restaurants landside and airside, and all areas are accessible to disabled passengers. There are facilities for baby changing and feeding. Business travellers have specialised lounges. The North and South Terminals are connected by a 0.75-mile (1.21 km), elevated, two-way automated people mover landside. They are not connected once past security.

South Terminal
South Terminal has 32 gates. The official opening of the central and main pier of what is now the South Terminal, with 11 aircraft stands, was on 9 June 1958. Gatwick was one of the world's first airports with an enclosed pier-based terminal, which allowed passengers to walk under cover to waiting areas near the aircraft (with only a short walk outdoors). Another feature of Gatwick's new air terminal was its modular design, permitting subsequent, phased expansion. As passenger numbers grew, a circular satellite pier was added to the terminal building. It was connected to the main terminal by the UK's first automated people mover system. This replaced the original North pier dating from 1962; and the people mover was subsequently replaced with a walkway and travelators.

The South Terminal was temporarily closed from June 2020, and all airlines normally operating from this terminal were relocated to the North Terminal, owing to the sharp decline in passenger traffic as a result of the devastating impact of the COVID-19 pandemic. It fully reopened in March 2022.

North Terminal
North Terminal has 33 gates, including three which can support an Airbus A380. Construction began on the North Terminal on land previously earmarked for a second runway in the draft plan of May 1970. This was the largest construction project south of London in the 1980s, costing £200 million. In 1991 a second aircraft pier was added to the North Terminal. On 16 May 2005 the new Pier 6 opened at a cost of £110 million, adding 11 pier-served aircraft stands. The pier is linked to the North Terminal's main building by the second-largest air passenger bridge in the world, spanning a taxiway and providing passengers with views of the airport and taxiing aircraft.

A large extension to the terminal was opened by former Prime Minister John Major in November 2011.

Terminal assignments and rearrangements
As part of a seven-year strategic commercial partnership between Gatwick and EasyJet, the airport proposed a number of changes to individual airlines' terminal locations. These would see EasyJet consolidate all its Gatwick operations in the North Terminal, while British Airways and Virgin Atlantic would swap their terminals. Gatwick believes that these terminal moves improve the airport's operational efficiency and resilience, as the use of different terminals by EasyJet and British Airways reduces pressure on the North Terminal's check-in, security, boarding and ramp areas at peak times. In addition, a terminal swap by Virgin frees up lounge and gate space for BA long-haul passengers in the South Terminal and, unlike BA's current short-haul schedules, Virgin's long-haul schedules do not clash with EasyJet's busy schedule in the North Terminal due to the airlines' differing peak times.

It was confirmed in January 2015 that British Airways would move all its flights to the South Terminal in November 2016 while all EasyJet flights will be consolidated in the North Terminal at the same time. However it was decided in February 2016 to postpone the agreed relocation of airlines until 25 January 2017, to avoid operational disruptions over the 2016–17 Christmas season and to give all parties involved enough time to deal with any unforeseen issues ahead of the February 2017 half-term holidays. The relocation of these airlines was accomplished by the revised date on 25 January 2017.

Airlines and destinations

The following airlines operate regular scheduled and charter flights to and from Gatwick Airport:

Traffic and statistics

Overview
In 2015, Gatwick became the first single-runway airport to handle more than 40 million passengers annually. By 2016, EasyJet accounted for over 40% of Gatwick's total passengers. When ranked by global passenger traffic, Gatwick is 35th busiest internationally and the eighth busiest airport in Europe. Gatwick is the world's leading low-cost airport and until March 2017 had the world's busiest single-use runway, with a maximum of 55 aircraft movements per hour.

Busiest routes

Traffic

Gatwick handled 186,172 passengers during its first seven months of operation after the 1956–58 reconstruction; the annual number of passengers passing through the airport was 368,000 in 1959 and 470,000 in 1960.
Passenger numbers reached one million for the first time during the 1962–63 fiscal year, with British United Airways (BUA) accounting for four-fifths. The 1.5 million mark was exceeded for the first time during the 1966–67 fiscal year. This was also the first time more than half a million scheduled passengers used the airport. Gatwick accommodated two million passengers for the first time during the 1967–68 fiscal year and three million in the 1969–70 fiscal year, with BUA accounting for nearly half. By the early 1970s, 5 million passengers used Gatwick each year, with a record 5.7 million during the 1973–74 fiscal year. During that period, British Caledonian accounted for approximately half of all charter passengers and three-fourths of scheduled passengers. Within a decade annual passenger numbers doubled, to 10 million; they doubled again, to over 20 million, by the late 1980s. By the turn of the millennium, Gatwick handled more than 30 million passengers annually.

46.1 million passengers passed through Gatwick in 2018, an increase of 1.1% over the previous year. North Atlantic and other long-haul traffic recorded increases over the previous year of 24.4% and 12.7% to 4.04 million and 4.65 million passengers, respectively. UK, European charter, Irish and European scheduled passenger traffic recorded decreases over the previous year of 8.7%, 5.7%, 1.1% and 0.9% to 3.73 million, 2.88 million, 1.67 million and 29.11 million, respectively. Air transport movements decreased by 0.7% to 283,926. Cargo volume increased by 16.1% to 112,676 metric tonnes.

Compared with a year earlier, January to March 2019 passenger numbers increased by 4% to 9.675 million (an increase of 374,700 over January to March 2018). The following changes were recorded amongst individual passenger traffic categories: North Atlantic traffic +15.3% (784,200 passengers); European scheduled traffic +3.9% (5.649 million passengers); other long-haul traffic +3.2% (1.277 million passengers); European charter traffic +2.1% (710,900 passengers); Irish traffic +1.6% (412,000 passengers) and UK traffic -0.2% (841,700 passengers). Air transport movements increased by 3.3% to 62,392. Cargo volume increased by 7.2% to 27,390 metric tonnes, which was driven by a 7.5% increase in overall long-haul passenger traffic. The growing popularity of the GatwickConnects flight connections assistance service provided by the airport for self-connecting passengers was driven by additional passengers changing flights at Gatwick whose journey originated in Edinburgh (+80%), Jersey (+58%) and Belfast (+50%).

Ground transport

Gatwick has set goals of 40% public transport use by the time annual passenger traffic reaches 40 million (in 2015) and 45% by the time it reaches 45 million.

Gatwick is also accessible from the A23, which serves Horley and Redhill to the north and Crawley and Brighton to the south. The A217 provides access northwards to the town of Reigate. The airport has long- and short-stay car parks at the airport and off-site, although these are often full in summer. Local restrictions limit parking at Gatwick.

Rail

The airport railway station, which is next to the South Terminal, provides connections along the Brighton Main Line and Thameslink Core to Victoria, London Bridge and St Pancras stations in London and Brighton, Worthing, Eastbourne, Portsmouth, Chichester and Bognor Regis to the south. Although the Gatwick Express to Victoria is the best-known service from the station, other companies (including Thameslink and Great Western Railway) also use the station and Southern services Victoria and London Bridge under its own name. Thameslink provides direct trains to Luton Airport; Great Western Railway trains directly link Gatwick Airport with Guildford and Reading for onwards connections to Oxford, Bristol, Plymouth and Cardiff. Pedestrians may reach Heathrow Airport by a X26 Express bus from outside East Croydon station, an intermediate stop for rail service to London.

London Oyster Cards and contactless cards have been accepted on all rail routes from Gatwick Airport into London since January 2016.

Bus
National Express Coaches operates coaches to Heathrow Airport, Stansted Airport and cities and towns throughout the region and country. Oxford Bus Company operates direct services to Oxford, and EasyBus operates mini-coaches from both terminals to Earls Court and West Brompton.

Local buses connect the North and South Terminals with Crawley, Horley, Redhill, Horsham and Caterham. Services are offered by Metrobus and Fastway, a partly guided bus rapid transit system which was the first of its kind to be built outside a major city.

Bicycle
Route 21 of the National Cycle Network passes under South Terminal, allowing virtually traffic-free cycling and walking northwards to Horley and southwards to Three Bridges and Crawley. A goods-style lift runs between the terminal and ground level (labelled "Lift to Cycle Route"), near Zone L.

Terminal transfer

The transit shuttle normally consists of two automatic, three-car, driver-less trains. Although colloquially known as a "monorail", the shuttle instead runs on a dual, concrete track with rubber tyres. The transit is ground-side, and besides linking the two terminals also serves to link the North terminal to the airport railway station.

The shuttle opened in 1987, along with the North Terminal, and initially used Adtranz C-100 people-mover cars which remained in operation until September 2009, by which time they had travelled a total of 2.5 million miles (4 million km). Gatwick began upgrading its shuttle service in April 2008, with a bus replacement service in place from September 2009. A new operating system and shuttle cars (six Bombardier CX-100 vehicles) was installed, and the guideway and transit stations were refurbished at a total cost of £45 million. The system re-opened on 1 July 2010, two months ahead of schedule; it featured live journey information and sensory technology to count the number of passengers at stations.

An earlier transit system, that opened in 1983 to link the main terminal (now the South Terminal) to the (then new) circular satellite pier, was the UK's first automated people-moving system. This system has since been replaced by a walkway-and-moving walkway link, although the remains of the elevated guideway are still visible.

Expansion proposals

Gatwick has been included in a number of reviews of airport capacity in southeastern England. Expansion options have included a third terminal and a second runway, although a 40-year agreement not to build a second runway was made in 1979 with West Sussex County Council. Expanded operations would allow Gatwick to handle more passengers than Heathrow does today, with a new terminal between two wide-spaced runways. This would complement or replace the South Terminal, depending on expected future traffic.

Airport management's proposal for a second runway (south of the existing runway and airport boundary) was unveiled in July 2013. This was shortlisted for further consideration by the Airports Commission in December 2013, and the commission's final report was published in July 2015. Another proposal would extend the North Terminal south, with a passenger bridge in the area currently occupied by aircraft stands without jet bridges. Gatwick's draft master plan (released for consultation on 13 October 2011) apparently dropped the passenger-bridge plan in favour of a mid-field satellite (next to the control tower) linking to the North Terminal as part of an expanded 2030 single-runway, two-terminal airport.

In late 2011, the Department for Transport (DfT) also began a feasibility study for a high-speed rail link between Gatwick and Heathrow as part of a plan combining the airports into a "collective" or "virtual hub", Heathwick. The scheme envisages a high-speed rail route parallel to the M25, covering  in 15 minutes. A 2018 proposal for a high-speed railway link to Heathrow, HS4Air, is currently being considered by the DfT. The proposal is part of a scheme to link the High Speed 1 and High Speed 2 railway lines and connect regional cities in Britain to the Channel Tunnel. The DfT will respond to the HS4Air plans in the autumn of 2018.

On 1 July 2015, the Airports Commission submitted its final report, recommending the expansion of Heathrow Airport as opposed to Gatwick. Whilst the commission recognised Gatwick's benefits and relatively less environmental consequences than Heathrow, they felt the economic benefits of Gatwick vs. Heathrow were not as great, nor as broad-ranging. Gatwick disputed the findings.

On 9 September 2021, GAL opened its first public consultation to carry out major works at the runway to increase its capacity from 64 million passengers a year to 75 million passengers a year by moving the northern "emergency" runway to the North to meet international standards for dual runway use. Airport management plans to use this runway only for take-offs by all but the largest aircraft. It hoped to receive approval in 2024, with the main works taking 4 years to complete, and 13 years to be fully complete. Works would also involve a new pier, hotels, terminal expansion and highway improvements including flyovers of the M23 Spur / A23 Airport Way at the terminal roundabouts.

Accidents and incidents

 15 September 1936 – A British Airways Ltd de Havilland DH 86 on a night mail flight to Germany crashed on takeoff, killing the airline's chief pilot and two crew members.
 17 February 1959 – A Turkish Airlines Vickers Viscount 794D (registration: TC-SEV) on an international charter flight crashed in heavy fog at Newdigate, Surrey, on its approach to Gatwick after striking trees. Fourteen of the 24 on board died, and Turkish Prime Minister Adnan Menderes was amongst the survivors.
 5 January 1969 – A Boeing 727-113C (registration: YA-FAR) operating flight 701 of Ariana Afghan Airlines arriving from Frankfurt Airport, Germany, crashed into a house in Fernhill (near Horley, Surrey) in low visibility. The flaps were not extended to maintain flight at final-approach speed. Forty-eight of the 62 on board died, in addition to two on the ground.
 28 January 1972 – A British Caledonian Vickers VC10-1109 (registration: G-ARTA) with no passengers aboard sustained severe structural damage as a result of a hard landing at Gatwick at the end of a short ferry flight from Heathrow, where the aircraft had been diverted due to fog at Gatwick. After touching down on runway 08 and applying spoilers and reverse thrust, the aircraft became airborne again, bounced twice and landed heavily. This resulted in a burst front wheel tyre, a separated wheel and a crumpled fuselage (immediately in front of and behind the wings). A survey of the aircraft's damage revealed that its airframe was bent out of shape, requiring extensive repairs to be restored to airworthiness. Since the repairs were not cost-effective, the airline's management decided to cannibalise the aircraft for spare parts before scrapping it at Gatwick in 1975.
 20 July 1975 – A British Island Airways (BIA) Handley Page Dart Herald 201 (registration: G-APWF) was involved in a runway accident while departing on a scheduled flight to Guernsey. An investigation concluded that the landing gear was retracted before the aircraft had become established in a climb and the flap setting and takeoff speed were incorrect. Although the aircraft incurred substantial damage, none of the 45 occupants were hurt.
 29 December 2014 – A Virgin Atlantic Boeing 747-400 (Registration: G-VROM) suffered a loss of hydraulic fluid whilst en route to Las Vegas. Shortly after departure, an alarm prompted the crew to return to Gatwick, when they discovered that an improperly installed actuator had caused the right wing landing gear to not deploy. The aircraft successfully landed on 3 main landing-gear bogies and was returned to service on 11 January 2015.
19–21 December 2018 – Major disruption to the airport was caused by a drone flying near the runway, which was shut for about six hours on 19 December. The airport reopened at 03:01 the next morning until another sighting forced it to close again about 45 minutes later. As of 00:15 on 21 December, the airport was still closed with about 110,000 passengers and 760 flights affected. Officials called the drone flying a "deliberate act of disruption", but did not classify it as terrorism. The army were deployed to assist police to resolve the incident. The runway reopened with limited capacity around 06:00 that day. Authorities suspended flights again from 17:10 to 18:23 on 21 December. Later that day a man and a woman were arrested in connection with the incident; the pair were released without charge on 23 December with Sussex Police saying that they "are no longer suspects".
26 February 2020 – a Titan Airways Airbus A321-211 suffered an engine fire immediately after takeoff. Shortly after the other engine surged and stalled. The aircraft landed safely at Gatwick eleven minutes after takeoff. The Air Accidents Investigation Branch determined fuel contamination following defective maintenance had gone undetected for two days and caused the incident. Safety recommendations were made to the European Union Aviation Safety Agency, and changes made by organisations including Airbus and the International Air Transport Association.

See also
 Airports of London
 List of airports in the United Kingdom and the British Crown Dependencies
 List of busiest airports by passenger traffic
 List of the busiest airports in Europe

Notes

References

Citations

Bibliography
 Gwynne, Peter. (1990) A History of Crawley (2nd Edition) Philmore. 
 King, John, with Tait, Geoff, (1980) Golden Gatwick – 50 Years of Aviation, British Airports Authority.
 King, John, (1986) Gatwick – The Evolution of an Airport, Gatwick Airport Ltd. and Sussex Industrial Archaeology Society. 
 Bain, Gordon, (1994), Gatwick Airport, Airlife Publishing Ltd. 
 Tait, Geoffrey, (1984), The Gatwick Express, G. Tait & Associates Ltd. 
 
 
 
 
 
 
 
 
 Wood, Alan. "Hoping for a Junkers: More Recollections on Prewar Airline Exploits From a Fledgling Gatwick Airport". Air Enthusiast, No. 83, September–October 1999, pp. 52–57.

External links 

 

 
Airports established in 1933
Airports in the London region
Airports in West Sussex
Buildings and structures in Crawley
Organisations based in Crawley

Royal Air Force stations in West Sussex
Transport in Crawley
Transport in West Sussex
1933 establishments in England